The Thames Valley Air Ambulance (TVAA), previously the Thames Valley and Chiltern Air Ambulance, is an organisation providing emergency medical services through the provision of a helicopter-based air ambulance covering the counties of Berkshire, Buckinghamshire and Oxfordshire in the South East England region.

Operations

The charity's helicopter, which is night-capable, is a Eurocopter EC135 operating between 7am and 2am. 
It is based at RAF Benson  roughly halfway between Oxford and Reading  with two pilots and a medical team. It also operates five emergency response vehicles (ERV), which, like the helicopter, carries a doctor and paramedic.

In the year ending September 2020, TVAA's income was £13.9million, against expenditure of £14.9M, of which £9.7M was spent on operating the charitable emergency service.
In 2019, TVAA responded to 2,670 incidents.

Media 
In 2018, the charity appeared on Channel 4's TV programme Emergency Helicopter Medics, which follows the crews responding and treating emergency patients. Other air ambulances that featured in the show include Great North Air Ambulance and East Anglian Air Ambulance.

See also 
Air ambulances in the United Kingdom

References

External links 

 
 

Air ambulance services in England